Kelly Kortum is an American politician serving as a member of the Montana House of Representatives from the 65th district. Elected in November 2020, he assumed office on January 4, 2021.

Background 
Kortum was raised in Ekalaka, Montana and earned a Bachelor of Science degree in computer science from Montana State University. Kortum has also worked in construction and as a firefighter, He is the founder of the Gallatin Progressive Action Network. Kortum was elected to the Montana House of Representatives in November 2020 and assumed office on January 4, 2021.

References 

Living people
Democratic Party members of the Montana House of Representatives
Montana State University alumni
People from Carter County, Montana
21st-century American politicians
21st-century American women politicians
Year of birth missing (living people)